Jehlani Galloway is an American football wide receiver for Western Michigan. He previously played college football for Boston College before transferring in 2021.

High school career
Galloway attended Classical High School in Providence, Rhode Island. Galloway caught 61 passes for 1,072 yards in his junior and senior seasons. A three-star recruit, Galloway committed to play college football at Boston College.

College career

Boston College
As a true freshman at Boston College in 2018 Galloway appeared in two games before redshirting. He recorded no stats in those games. 

As a redshirt freshman in 2019 Galloway played in six games, recording no stats in those games. 

In 2020 as a redshirt sophomore Galloway appeared in all eleven games for the Eagles, starting one of them. He caught fifteen passes for 197 yards and two receiving touchdowns. He had his best game of the year against Virginia Tech where he hauled in a career-high four receptions along with another career-high 68 receiving yards despite the teams loss. Galloway caught his first career touchdown on a 21-yard pass from Phil Jurkovec against Louisville. 

As a redshirt junior in 2021, Galloway had a smaller roll for Boston College, appearing in nine games and catching only three passes for eighteen yards as he was the backup "Z" wide receiver behind Zay Flowers.

Western Michigan
On January 19, 2022, Galloway entered the transfer portal, and on July 31, 2022, he transferred to Western Michigan University to play for the Western Michigan Broncos.

Statistics

Personal life
Galloway is the son of Steve and Cheryl Galloway and is a recipient of The Skeffington Family Scholarship Fund.

References

External links
Boston College Eagles bio
Western Michigan Broncos bio

Western Michigan Broncos football players
Boston College Eagles football players
Players of American football from Rhode Island
American football wide receivers
Living people
1999 births
Sportspeople from Providence, Rhode Island